The emblem of Curaçao is a yet to be adopted national symbol of Curaçao. The design will be based on a concept by Adresetti Monart featuring the Queen Emma Bridge, a cactus, a hummingbird and a traditional fishing boat, which was chosen through a design competition held in 2022. The emblem is set to replace the coat of arms of Curaçao, which has been in use since 24 July 1964.

History

Seal of Curaçao 
Before 1964, the coats of arms of the Netherlands, and later, the Netherlands Antilles were used on Curaçao, as it did not have a coat of arms of its own. As an alternative, a modified version of the seal of the Dutch West India Company (WIC) was adopted in 1795 as the seal of Curaçao. It featured a sailing ship surrounded by the text: .

Coat of arms of Curaçao 
The design for the coat of arms of Curaçao was proposed by the High Council of Nobility in 1964, when Curaçao was still an island territory of the Netherlands Antilles. It depicts a sailing ship of the WIC and a laraha (bitter orange), as well as the coat of arms of Amsterdam as an inescutcheon. The design symbolizes Curaçao's history and connection with the House of Orange-Nassau and the city of Amsterdam. The adoption of the coat of arms led to criticism from, among others, the Democratic Party due to its references to the island's colonial period.

The coat of arms was blazoned as: Party per pale, first argent a sailboat proper in full sail on a sea azure, second argent a laraha vert on a mount in base of the same, overall a inescutcheon gules a pale sable three saltorels argent.

Replacement of the coat of arms 

On 23 December 2020, ten years after the dissolution of the Netherlands Antilles, the Rhuggenaath cabinet decided that the coat of arms needed to be replaced by a new design, as this was deemed important for nation-building. On 4 July 2022, a design competition was launched for a new emblem to replace the coat of arms. Designs could be submitted from 20 July to 19 August 2022, after which they were evaluated by a committee of experts. One of the requirements is that the motto must be in Papiamentu.

Citizens of the Kingdom of the Netherlands who were born – or who have at least one parent who was born – in Curaçao (or elsewhere in the Netherlands Antilles and registered as a resident of Curaçao before 2010) could submit a design. Foreign-born citizens who are naturalized in Curaçao could also enter the competition. These rules received some criticism in the media for being discriminative against citizens from the European part of the Kingdom who reside in Curaçao.

A total of 205 designs were submitted to the competition. From 20 to 30 September 2022, the public could vote for their favorite out of ten designs selected by the committee. The winning design was revealed on 10 October 2022 by Prime Minister Gilmar Pisas and Minister of Education, Science, Culture and Sport Sithree van Heydoorn. The designer of the winning emblem was awarded .

Gallery

See also
 Coat of arms of Aruba
 Coat of arms of Bonaire

References

Curaçao
Curaçao
Curaçao